Bangladesh is one of the densely populated countries in the world; a home for more than 160 million people. It  progresses immensely in human development, particularly in the areas of literacy and life expectancy, but economic inequality has increased and about 32%, i.e. 50 million people still live in extreme poverty.

Hunger in Bangladesh is one of the major issues that affects the citizens. In Bangladesh 40% of the country falls under three categories: hunger, starvation and chronic hunger.

There are many consequences of hunger, namely malnutrition, under nutrition, child stunting and child wasting. According to UNICEF, there are three main outcomes: underweight (moderately) 36.4%, stunting is at 41.3%, wasting is at 15.6%.

Child stunting is defined as a child being two standard deviations lower than average height for their age and child wasting is a child who is two standard deviations lower than average weight for height.

Hunger is an issue that has stagnated over the years, yet Bangladesh has shown tremendous efforts towards hunger reduction in the last couple of years, particularly during one of their hardest times during the late 1970s, although the early 2000s were also challenging. During this famine period, many farmers had no idea how to provide food given the land lacked nutrients due to aggressive farming.

Causes
Factors that contribute to the hunger over various states of Bangladesh is lack of resources and education. BMC Public Health defines hunger as "Limited or uncertain availability of nutritionally adequate and safe foods or limited or uncertain ability to acquire acceptable foods in socially acceptable ways".

History 
Following the war for their liberation in 1971, Bangladesh was faced with a multitude of problems, both physical and economical. Their economy was seriously lacking and they had to deal with trying to fix all of the physical damage that was caused by the fighting. Later on in 1974, Bangladesh was hit by an intense monsoon that wiped out most of the crops for that year. The monsoon, paired with existing issues, like those caused by the war for liberation, created a massively devastating famine.

Facts 
 Bangladesh has the highest rate of underweight children among all the countries in southern Asia. One of each two children under 5 is detained or stunted chronically, and 14 percent suffer from  acute waste. WHO estimates two in three deaths under five are caused by malnutrition.
 Of the 50 million people missing food security in Bangladesh, less than half have access to food security network programs
 Food insecurity and malnutrition between  populations at risk are high. These are influenced by seasonality and the price of available foods.
 Food insecurity in Bangladesh is derived from extreme poverty due to under and unemployment, inadequate access to land for cultivation, social exclusion and natural disasters. In these endangered, poor populations, women and children are more affected by undernutrition and malnutrition.
 About 24 percent of women has a reduced weight and 13 percent are short of stature, which significantly increases the likelihood that their children are atrophied.
 About 25% of children's diets complies with food varieties standards in which a minimum of 4 out of 7 food groups is consumed every day.
 Sacrifices in food consumption for the good of children's food, particularly in moments of scarcity, is highly disseminated. In most cases, it is an adult woman who has to make a sacrifice. The disproportionate poverty aimed at women and children comes due to the discrimination and traditions of exclusion, leaving them the most vulnerable. 
 In the rich families, 26 percent of children under 5 are stunted and 12 percent are wasted. Undernutrition is not just a symptom of poverty. Poverty has decreased considerably since 2010, falling from 49% to around 25% in 2016. However, hunger still persists.
 Micronutrient shortcomings lead to "Hidden Hunger`.
 Environmental disasters, if they have been ignored could increase food insecurity.  Moreover, flooding,rural unemployment, lack of education and training in sustainable agricultural methods caused soil degradation that affects rice production.

Statistics 
Hunger in Bangladesh middle and lower class population is growing at a fast rate compared to other south Asian countries and hunger is still an issue. Bangladesh has improved economically but still faces national huge hunger problem with approximately 40 million close to starvation. Global Hunger Index is ranking system that measures hunger globally, regionally, and by country. Bangladesh currently ranks 90 out of 118 countries. Children suffering from chronic hunger are dying every 5 seconds.

Children
Food Security Nutritional Surveillance Project conducted studies vulnerable zones: coastal belt, eastern hills, hoar region, Padma chars, northern chars. In total there were 14,712 children from 6–59 months of aged who suffered from food insecurity. Majority of the children who suffer from hunger live in rural areas making up 94% of the experiment.

Adults
Hunger and malnutrition not only effect the children but also older individuals; a study in Matlab which is located 55 km south east of Dhaka 850 elderly people greater than 60 years of age were part of the survey data. During the duration of the experiment 63 died due to hunger and 11 individuals migrated. The results showed that due to hunger women were more likely to develop chronic illnesses. The chronic illnesses that were developed were tied to the malnourishment they had as children.

Locational data 
Seasonal hunger is known as "monga" in some rural areas of Bangladesh, specifically in the northwest. This region, also referred to as the greater Rangpur region, completely relies on a select few major rice crops. The issue with this comes from the fact that this limited number of crops only covers nine months out of the year, leaving the people of this region with an extreme food shortage for the months of September to November. A second, lesser "monga" happens annually a few months before the main and more damaging "monga" in the latter half of each year. The lesser "monga" lasts for roughly a month, occurring from mid-April to mid-March.

Historical data 
The population below the minimum level of energy consumption in the diet (also known as the prevalence of the undernourishment) shows the percentage of the population whose food intake is insufficient to continuously meet the requirements of food energy. The data shown as 5 represents a prevalence of undernourishment less than 5%.

Global Hunger Index 
The Global Hunger Index (GHI) is a means of calculating and tracing hunger and undernutrition at global, regional, and national levels.

GHI Severity Scale

GHI combines 4 component indicators

 the proportion of the undernourished as a percentage of the population;
 the proportion of children under the age of five suffering from wasting, a sign of acute undernutrition;
 the proportion of children under the age of five suffering from stunting, a sign of chronic undernutrition; and
 the mortality rate of children under the age of five.

Bangladesh GHI 
In the 2020 GHI, Bangladesh secures 75th position out of 107 countries. Bangladesh scores 20.4 , which is, according to severity scale, the level of hunger is "serious".

Impact
Food availability can have perception and behavioral consequences. Trials were held in Gaibandha District in northwestern Bangladesh to study a household's food insecurity ranking. Certain domains were established within 6-month period to measure food insecurity.

 Security and predictability over food acquisition
 Reduction in food quality and/or quantity
 Socially acceptable behaviors or strategies to augment resources on credit from shops and borrowing food from relatives.

Results were that 65% of the households were suffering from hunger had a woman as head of the house; 35% men were the head of the household.

Gender bias
In certain house holds , there are gender preferences on feeding their members. In small villages where males are held in a different standards,  parents will feed their sons over their daughters. Apart from effects of mother nature, it has also been recorded that the head of the household has a great impact in regards to the food consumption. In Bangladesh women are still discriminated and are seen as inferior. Household where females are the bread winner is correlated to less food on the table. Women make up 32% of the individuals under the poverty line. In some cases if the women in the household are educated it reduces their chance of starvation by 43%  In recent years women have mobilized to try reverse this trend. Women in Bangladesh have arranged an organization to fight chronic hunger; a total of 145,000 women. Their goal is to reduce the number of uneducated women and promote self value and show that women are just as capable of providing for their household. Uneducated women are prone to earn a less than the average rate for women. Overall these women are trying to eradicate chronic hunger among their children. During this hard time, the number of children and elders who have passed away has increased by 30%. It wasn't until the United States pressured Bangladesh politicians to help their farmers.

Impact of Climate change on food security 

Over the past two decades, floods, droughts and hurricanes have increasingly caused major economic losses and livelihood damage in Bangladesh. Agriculture is a major industry that accounts for nearly 20% of GDP and 65% of the labor force, and faces huge risks. Agriculture is a major industry that accounts for nearly 20% of GDP and 65% of the labor force, all are at risk. Adaptation to climate change and its alleviation are the core issues of sustainable development and food security in Bangladesh.Bangladesh's agriculture relies heavily on the specific conditions of the annual floods because they recognize that large-scale floods that occur infrequently can have catastrophic effects. Climate change is expected to reduce the output of rice, Bangladesh’s main crop, and increase the country’s dependence on other crops and imported grains.On the whole, due to climate change, Bangladesh's agricultural GDP is expected to decline by 3.1% per year. These  will not only affect the agricultural sector, but also the entire food chain, right down to household consumption.

Bangladesh on SDG 2 (Zero hunger) 

Due to the COVID- 19  pandemic, poverty and extreme poverty are coming back to people lives, who had overcome themselves from the curse of poverty prior to this pandemic.

The reasons include but are not limited to: unemployment, quarantine, and lockdown. People who live on poverty margins cannot buy food, and have a hard time gaining access to nutritious food. The government must play a pivotal role in this difficult period by providing food or guiding different groups to collect money to guarantee that nobody is hungry in this critical situation. To achieve this intricacy, we must strive sustainable agriculture.

Action against hunger

What should be done? 
According to the World Bank, Bangladesh loses about 1% of its agricultural land annually. This leads to scarcity, as not all land is arable.
 To take full advantage of global economy, the government should impart social security benefits to the endangered population. This will improve the purchasing power of poorer and stimulating demand, creating vacancies and local economies. Investing in comprehensive development is not just moral but also economically healthy.
 One third of the 4 billion metric tons of food is produced annually, which costs the world economy of 750 billion dollars. The food is often wasted in rich nations, while food is lost in developing countries due to the lack of storage or incapacity of farmers to sell their crops.
 Everyone must have access to healthy foods. By building sustainable markets, we must initiate  and invest in more sustainable procurement chains. Most of the  farmers do not receive the best price when they sell their crops. Due to the lack of transport, they cannot sell the crops directly. Improvement of rural infrastructure, especially roads, storage facilities and electricity will allow the farmers reaching to a broader market.
 Rice, wheat, corn and soy currently represent 60% of the global calorie consumption. To tackle climate change, food supply and access, the government and NGOs should help farmers to investigate and produce new crops. The variety of crops can provide people with nutrients and an active lifestyle. To achieve this goal, the farmers must be educated in the cultivation of these products and provide them with the necessary tools and knowledge . Likewise, the public should be informed and educated about the nutritional benefits of various foods.
 Excellent health and nutrition are fundamental to the development of a child, especially for about two years. It needs to be  ensured that small children and pregnant women get required nutrition  to grow healthily.
 Most of the nations have conquered hunger  by sustainable agriculture. Climate change is one of the most notable factors that contribute to famine. It relates the food production to the food availability; Since production decreases, the price of food increases; Therefore, poverty-stricken people can not buy it and the rate of hunger starts to get up. Climate-smart agriculture can help in reducing hunger by reducing the carbon footprint of agricultural production. Climate-smart strategies and implementations help in reducing not only hunger but also poverty.
 Individuals may contribute in the fight against hunger, by changing their lifestyles – at home, at work, and in the community – by assisting local farmers or market places and adopting sustainable food choices.
 Awareness should be created to combat food waste by promoting and encouraging people for balanced eating.

External links 
 https://bdnews24.com/bangladesh/2015/03/29/bangladesh-s-serious-hidden-hunger-problem

Further reading

References

Poverty in Bangladesh
B
Demographics of Bangladesh